Tommy Vlahopoulos (born December 12, 1979) is an American film producer. He is known for producing the 2015 film Intruders and the upcoming 2017 film Behind the Sightings. His company, Tommy V Productions, was the production studio for Intruders and Behind the Sightings, along with the upcoming films Glass Jaw and The Rake, as well as Crawl To Me, an upcoming film adaptation of the comic book miniseries of the same name.

Filmography

As executive producer
 Intruders (2015)
 Behind the Sightings (2017)

References

External links
 

1979 births
Living people
American filmmakers
Film producers from New York (state)
People from Roslyn, New York